Lisa Mazzone (born 25 January 1988) is a prominent Green Party politician in Switzerland. She was elected to the Swiss parliament ("Nationalrat" / "Cussegl naziunal") on 18 October 2015, becoming Switzerland's youngest member of parliament in the process. Most of her political interventions to date have involved environmental issues.

Provenance
Lisa Mazzone was born in Geneva, the largest city in the francophone western part of Switzerland. She grew up in nearby Versoix, where she attended school and where until 2011 Luigi Mazzone, her father, Sergio Mazzone, served as a city councillor, representing the "Geneva Ecologist Party" ("Parti écologiste de Genève"). He is also a retired installer of solar panels. Her mother died in 2013: she had worked as a psychiatrist. Three of Lisa Mazzone's four grand parents emigrated from Italy to work at the CERN ("European Organization for Nuclear Research" / "Organisation européenne pour la recherche nucléaire") which occupies a large site straddling the Franco-Swiss frontier a short distance to the north of Geneva. Along with her Swiss passport she also carries an Italian passport. Her paternal grandmother, born Beatrice Gmur, who also worked at the CERN, came originally from St. Gallen, a politically conservative canton in eastern Switzerland.

Parliaments
In 2006, aged 18, Mazzone took part in the establishment of the Youth Parliament ("parlement des jeunes") at Versoix. She became a member of the national committee of the Swiss Federation of Youth Parliament in 2007/08. She joined the Green Party in 2008. She served as president of the Geneva party between March 2014 and March 2016. She then became Party Vice-President for the Suisse Romande region in succession to Robert Cramer on 16 April 2016.

Bicycles and transport
Many of the slopes around the foreshore at the western end of Lake Geneva are reassuringly gentle: Lisa Mazzone became a passionate advocate for cycling when she was barely a teenager. She worked as a co-ordinator for the Geneva Pro-Vélo association between 2010 and 2014. In 2014 she stepped down from that job in order to become Project Manager with the association. Since April 2015 she has also been vice-president at the "National Association for Transportation and the Environment" ("Association transports et environnement"). She has subsequently become the association's president for the francophone region surrounding Geneva.

Political representative
Mazzone sat as a municipal councillor ("Conseil communal") in Le Grand-Saconnex - the multi-cultural central Geneva municipality which includes both the city airport and several major United Nations facilities within its boundaries - from 2011 till June 2013. 2013 was also  the year in which she graduated from the University of Geneva with a Bachelor en Lettres degree in Latin and French. As she later explained to an interviewer, that was when she decided to devote herself 100% to her favourite pastime, political and social ("associatif") engagement.  Later that year, on 6 October 2013, she was elected to membership of the Grand Council of Geneva ("Grand Conseil de Genève" / cantonal parliament) for the five-year term ending in 2018. The 2013 election had left the Green Party with just 10 of the 100 Grand Council seats. Within the Geneva parliament she was a member of the transport commission and of the energy commission, becoming chair of the latter in December 2014. In March 2014 she had become leader of the Green Party team.

Stop bunkers
Because of the country's exceptionally precautionary cold war era building regulations, far more Swiss homes and offices feature their own underground nuclear bunkers than equivalent buildings elsewhere in Western Europe. In February 2015 Lisa Mazzone came to prominence as a leader in the Grand Council of a small group of deputies supporting the so-called "stop bunkers" movement.   The issue concerned the extent to which the city authorities, in defiance of building regulations stating that premises with a floor below ground level could not be used as living accommodation, had been using nuclear bunkers to accommodate asylum seekers. The "stop bunkers" protesters included (but were not restricted to) asylum seekers being accommodated underground who were complaining about lack of sunshine or ventilation, terrible and rotting food, the impossibility of sleeping under the 24-hour lighting and in the noisy conditions, and the indestrucability of the bed bugs.

National parliament
Lisa Mazzone was elected to the Swiss parliament ("Conseil national" / "Consiglio Nazionale") on 18 October 2015, becoming Switzerland's youngest member of parliament.<ref name=L She delivered her ten-minute maiden speech to the National Council on 30 November  2015, which was her first day in the parliament. Under the relevant cantonal legislation, election to the national parliament had meant resignation from the Grand Council of Geneva on 12 November 2015.   At the time of her election she told an interviewer:
 "My orientation, based on my personal values, moves me towards considerations about free time and about sharing - as regards 'things', wealth and knowledge. It is time to move on from the strict focus on economic productivity which prevails  today  ...  the [political] left must launch its own initiatives, project and referendums, and not spend its time on the defensive".

In October 2018 Mazzone announced that in the 2019 national elections she would stand not for re-election to the National Council ("Conseil national" - lower house) but as a candidate for election to the Council of States (Switzerland) ("Conseil des États" / "Cussegl dals Stadi"), which is the upper house of the national parliament.   The relationship between the two chambers of the Swiss national parliament is roughly analogous to that between the German Bundesrat (upper house) and Bundestag (lower house).   In the elections for the "Conseil des États" she is hoping to win the seat made vacant by the recently announced retirement from the chamber of her party colleague Robert Cramer. The elections in question are scheduled for October 2019.

Beyond parliament
Much of Lisa Mazzone's most visible political activity still takes place outside parliament. She chairs the organisation "Regional Co-ordination for a Geneva city airport respectful of the environment and of the residents" ("Coordination régionale pour un aéroport de Genève urbain, respectueux de l'environnement et de la population" / CARPE) which in December 2016 tabled a cantonal "people's initiative", backed by 14,450 signatures, calling for "democratic control in respect of Geneva airport" ("Pour un pilotage démocratique de l'aéroport de Genève").

She is co-president, along with Priska Seiler Graf of the Social Democratic Party in Zürich, of the "Environment and Health Coalition for responsible air transport" ("Coalition environnement et santé pour un transport aérien responsable" / CESAR) created in September 2016 by 20 like-minded Swiss associations and organisations. In March 2017 she became one of two co-presidents of the CIVIVA, a national organisation which makes arrangements for an extended period of alternative public service ("Service civil" / "Zivildienst") to be performed by male citizens unwilling, for reasons of conscience, to undertake the normal terms of (otherwise compulsory) military service. Since May 2018 she has also served as president for the Swiss section of the Society for Threatened Peoples which emerged in 1970 from the Hamburg-based "Aktion Biafra-Hilfe" movement.

Notes

References

People from the canton of Geneva
Canton of Geneva politicians
21st-century Swiss women politicians
21st-century Swiss politicians
Green Party of Switzerland politicians
1988 births
Living people